Charline Vanhoenacker (born 31 December 1977, La Louvière), is a Belgian journalist and humorist, radio host and producer.

From 2016 to 2017, she was host of L'Émission politique.

Life 
She graduated from Université libre de Bruxelles, and École supérieure de journalisme de Paris.

She was a freelance writer for Le Soir in Belgium. She worked for RTBF. She wrote a blog, @ Pèèèris. She was hired by Arrêt sur images. In 2012, she was a columnist for France Inter. In 2013, she co-hosted the show Le Septante-cinq minutes, with Alex Vizorek.

From 2016 to 2017, Vanhoenacker hosted a humor segment at the end of L'Émission politique, on France 2.

In 2019, Vanhoenacker was the co-editor of Siné Madame.

On 16 September 2021, Yom Kippur, Vanhoenacker published on her Twitter a video where she drew a mustache of Hitler over a poster of Éric Zemmour, a Jewish politician and potential candidate for the 2022 presidential election, which created a controversy in the French media.

References 

1977 births
Belgian television presenters
Living people
Université libre de Bruxelles alumni
People from La Louvière
Belgian humorists
Women humorists
Belgian radio presenters
Belgian women radio presenters
Belgian women television presenters
Belgian columnists
Belgian women columnists